The 2017 Virginia Cavaliers football team represented the University of Virginia during the 2017 NCAA Division I FBS football season. The Cavaliers were led by second-year head coach Bronco Mendenhall and played their home games at Scott Stadium. They competed as members of the Coastal Division in the Atlantic Coast Conference. They finished the season 6–7, 3–5 in ACC play to finish in a three-way tie for fourth place in the Coastal Division. They were invited to the Military Bowl where they lost to Navy.

Roster

Coaching changes

On June 21, 2017 Vic So'oto was hired as defensive line coach. So'oto replaces Ruffin McNeill who joined the University of Oklahoma coaching staff.

Depth chart

Schedule

Source:

Game summaries

William & Mary

Indiana

UConn

at Boise State

The Cavaliers came in as thirteen point underdogs against the Broncos and quickly went down 7–0 within the first three minutes. After this shaky start, the Cavaliers took a 21–14 lead into halftime led by success in the passing game on offense. To start the second half, the Cavaliers took just 3 plays to score, stretching the lead to 28–14. Virginia pressed its advantage to 42–14 before Boise State made it 42–23 on a late safety and touchdown.  The win has been hailed as Virginia's "most impressive win" so far under Coach Mendenhall.

Duke

at North Carolina

Boston College

at Pittsburgh

Georgia Tech

at Louisville

at Miami (FL)

Virginia Tech

at Navy (Military Bowl)

2018 NFL Draft

References

Virginia
Virginia Cavaliers football seasons
Virginia Cavaliers football